Dianthus plumarius, also known as the common pink, garden pink, or wild pink, or simply pink, is a species of flowering plant in the family Caryophyllaceae.

Description

Dianthus plumarius is a compact evergreen perennial reaching on average  in height. The stem is green, erect, glabrous and branched on the top. The leaves are opposite, simple, linear and sessile, more or less erect and flexuous, with a sheath embracing the stem. The flowers are radially symmetric, hermaphrodite, gathered in scapes of 3–5 flowers, with 10 stamens. The flowering period extends from May through August. The fruits are capsules with a few seeds.

Distribution

This species is native to Austria, Croatia, and Slovenia, and naturalized in Italy, Germany, and the United Kingdom.

In the United States it is known to grow invasively in Alabama, South Carolina, North Carolina, Virginia, Pennsylvania, Indiana, Illinois, Missouri, Wisconsin, Michigan, New York State, New Hampshire, Vermont, Maine, and California

Etymology
While the origin of the name "pink" is uncertain, within two decades of its 1570 appearance in the written record, that flower's name was being used to refer to the pastel red known as pink in English today. Whether the pinking shear shares a common origin, or is named after the flower, is uncertain.

See also
 List of Award of Garden Merit dianthus

References

plumarius